Charles Fitzgerald (1791–1887) was Governor of the Gambia and Western Australia.

Charles Fitzgerald may also refer to:
Charles FitzGerald, 1st Baron Lecale (1756–1810), Irish peer and politician
Charles FitzGerald, 4th Duke of Leinster (1819–1887), Irish duke and politician
Charles Cooper Penrose-Fitzgerald (1841–1921), British naval officer
Charles Fitzgerald (rugby) (1899–1961), New Zealand rugby union and rugby league footballer
C. L. Fitzgerald (Charles L. Fitzgerald, 1836–?), British socialist activist and journalist
C. P. Fitzgerald (Charles Patrick Fitzgerald, 1902–1992), British-born Australian academic
Charles Borromeo Fitzgerald (1865–1907), barrister and politician from Queensland, Australia